The Lycée Jules-Ferry is a public secondary and higher education school located in the 9th arrondissement of Paris. It is famous especially since it was used in Diane Kurys's film, Peppermint Soda (Diabolo menthe, 1977).

This public school of Paris is composed by a collège, a lycée and by CPGE.

Since its creation, this high school had a tradition with literary studies. There are literary and humanities Classes préparatoires aux grandes écoles, for students that are preparing the very competitive national exams that lead to the prestigious École Normale Supérieure de Lyon academy.

Jules-Ferry